Romano Vio (February 11, 1913 – August 23, 1984) was an Italian sculptor. He was born in Venice and taught sculpture there.

Timeline

 1931/1935 - Exhibited at the Bevilacqua La Masa Gallery in Venice
 1932/1936 - Studied and worked with Eugenio Bellotto at the Academy of Fine Arts in Venice
 1934 -	  Modelled the bust of Luigi Passoni
 1935 -	  Awarded Gold Medal at the National Exhibition for Artists and Graduates in Genoa with the high relief “A Mother’s Dream” bought by Venice City Council
 1937 -	  Submitted an entry for the Sanremo Prize
 1938 -	  Admitted to the XIX Venice Biennale with a medal to Guglielmo Marconi, bought by Milan City Council; The Boxer, portraits, Ploughing, Fisherman
 1939 -	  Won the “D. Fadiga” prize for sculpture in Venice
 1940 -	Admitted to the XX Venice Biennale; portrait of an old man – 1939/40 sports medal. Appointed to the post of Assistant to Umberto Baglioni at the Academy of Fine Arts in Venice
 1941 -	Won the competition for and realised the lions of the obelisk in Piazza del Duomo in Traù (Dalmatia). Call to arms. Copy from Colleoni, Sansovinian reproductions
 1945 -	Returned from war having completed, counting all the various calls to arms, 12 years military service. His war service 1940/43 was recognised in 1956 with the Military Cross
 1946 -	At the end of the war he returned to work and to teaching at the Academy of Fine Arts in Venice as Assistant to Venanzo Crocetti
 1947 -	Modelled the bronze statue of St. Anthony for the Church in Camposanpiero; portrait of Francesco
 1948 -	Won First Prize at the “Tempio” exhibition in Padua. “Madonna degli Alpini”, a high relief in stone for Pieve di Soligo.  “L’Ascolto”, bronze
 1949 -	Highly commended in the competition for the doors for St. Peter’s in Rome. Sketch in the Vatican Galleries Vatican doors: First Door Siena, on the right: St. Peter, Constantine, Gregory the Great, Foundation of the Basilica, Coronation of Charlemagne, Crusade, Religious Orders, 1300 Jubilee Year; on the left: Leo III, Gregory VII, Nicholas V, Return from Avignon, Discovery of America, Council of Trent, Battle of Lepanto, the new Vatican Basilica, Rafael, Michelangelo, Bernini Second Door Perugia, on the left: Paul III, Pius IV, St. Pius V, Missions, the new religious Orders, three personages; on the right: Paul V, Dogma of the Immaculate Conception, Vatican Council, Pius VII, Pius VIII, Pius IX. Modelled the Holy Spirit Altar and candlesticks for the Pro-civitate Christiana in Assisi. Plaster models of the Doors for Siena Cathedral
 1950 -	Took part in the International Exhibition of Sacred Art in Rome with “St. Benedict”
 1951 -	Exhibited at the VI    Rome Quadriennale. Admitted to the XXV Venice Biennale
 1953 -	Commended in the “Pinocchio” competition in Collodi. The bronze “Dana” exhibited at the Turin Quadriennale. Won the “Città di Pordenone” First Prize for sculpture. Completed a series of works for the cathedral and for the Church of S. Giuseppe in Cavarzere, Madonna for the bell-tower, Via Crucis. Exhibition of sacred art in Bologna
 1954 - 	First Prize with Jesus the Worker in Assisi
 1955- 	First Prize in the competition for “Our Lady of the Assumption” for the church in Vitinia. First Prize in the competition for the plaque of the Belfiore Martyrs, Venice. Verona Biennale – Portrait of a Girl with Plaits.
 1956 - 	Appointed teacher of decorative sculpturing at the Academy of Fine Arts in Venice. Won the City of Savona national competition dedicated to the Resistance. Won the national competition for the Monument to the musician Umberto Giordano
 1956/1961 -  Works completed and placed in the Giordano Park in Foggia. Beautiful lady, bronze. Simonetta, bronze, exhibited at the Venice Biennale. Head of a man, bust of a woman in bronze, Woman with a Goose
 1957 - 	The Sleeping Woman exhibited at the Turin Quadriennale. Second prize in artisanship in Aquila
 1958 -	Shared First Prize at the Biennale of Sacred Art in Bologna with St. Clare Driving Out the Saracens. Flight into Egypt, bas-relief
 1959 -	Won “Montecatini” prize at the International Exhibition in Carrara
 1960 -	Completed the Via Crucis and the Altar for the Bianconi Chapel in Monza
 1962 -	Completed the Monument to Giuseppe Marchetti, the youngest Garibaldian hero, and the plaque to the scientist Olivi for the city of Chioggia
 1963 -	Nominated member of the Accademia Nazionale di San Luca in Rome. Modelled a St. Anthony for Padua
 1964 -	Completed the Monument to the Fallen in Arquà Polesine. Entered competition for the Monument to the Partisan Woman, work now in Cá Pesaro Museum of Modern Art, Venice
 1965 - 	The Boxer, bronze, private collection. IX Rome Quadriennale
 1966 - 	Christ Rising from the Ruins, Ecce Homo, bronze; Woman in an Armchair, cement
 1967 - 	Perugia, altarpiece of panels containing 16 figures
 1968 - 	Girl with a Snail, cement
 1969 - 	Our Standard, bronze
 1970 - 	Figure in cement (Cojazzi private collection). Deposition from the Cross, terracotta. Copy of George Washington by Antonio Canova for North Carolina State Capitol. Annunciation, terracotta. St. Agatha, medallion
 1971 - 	Completed in marble the monument to the industrialist Franco Marinotti in Torviscosa
 1972 -	Juggler with Dog, bronze. Madonna di Fátima Manizales for Columbia. The Four Seasons, 4 female figurines depicting the seasons
 1973 - 	Completed the bust of the economist Antonio Santarelli for the city of Aquila now housed in the Library
 1974 - 	Maternity, Boy
 1975 - 	Woman Seated, Nude. Series of works for USA and Brazil. Portrait of Romiatti, of a girl
 1976 -	Ballerina at rest, Ballerina Tying her Shoe, Lady with Umbrella
 1978 -	Madonna del Carmelo for the Carmini Church in Venice. Competition and Exhibition of Dantesque Sculpture in Ravenna (exhibiting To Overcome Deceit, The Violent against the Next Man, and a medal)
 1979 -	Large-scale bronze statue of “Madonna and Child” for the Church of Altobello in Mestre. Padre Pio in bronze and St. Blaise cast in silver with embossment for Maratea. Series of portraits
 1980 - 	Copy of St. James for the church of S. Giacometo in Rialto Venice. Padre Pio, Via Crucis, Font, Paschal candlestick and St. Anthony for Mira Porte
 1981 -	Made Knight of the Republic
 1982 -	Exhibition in the Monastery of S. Nicolờ. Donates to the church of S. Nicolờ a statue of St. Francis which was then cast in bronze at the expense of the parishioners. The Greccio Crib, St. Francis Talking to the Birds, The Canticle of Creatures, Paschal candlestick for the Church of S. Ignazio in Venice Lido
 1983 -	Completed two triptychs (the theological virtues and the three evangelical counsels) and reliquary for the church in Fossờ. Annunciation. The Wait – female figure. Female nude in carved wood in full relief
 1984 -	Works on several pieces for the Rome Quadriennale. Reliquary of the three guardian saints of Padua: St. Anthony, St. Gregory, St. Leopold. Dies on 23 August.
There are many other works that cannot be dated.

There are countless portraits, small bronzes, and medals in galleries and private collections in Italy and abroad. There are also numerous works of which only a photographic record remains. The critics have always been intrigued by his incomparable technical skill and by the poetic pathos of his works, always predisposed to sense or share the sometimes metaphorical lofty meanings that at times interact in many of Vio’s works, inevitably kindling irrepressible intellectual forays. Vio was neither the first nor the only person to perceive that “classic” is and remains one of the fundamental problems of modern culture, where the artist’s dilemma is to break away from or commit to tradition. Vio was aware of this, and continues classicism but has the ability to break away from the logical dualism of reality. He no longer appears interested in the gnoseological content of classics but rather in the human side; therefore Vio is an ethical figurative leading artist and as such forms part of the great Italian tradition, from Donatello to Canova. He has the knowledge to reform that tradition in a difficult and contradictory century to bring us to a unique concept of beauty but he surpasses classic classicism in the sense that art is immune to stylistic pre-conditions. His art becomes a testimony understood as an awareness of the value and order of events, sublimely demonstrated in the Giordano works in Foggia.

References

External links
Official website

1913 births
1984 deaths
Sculptors from Venice
20th-century Italian sculptors
20th-century Italian male artists
Italian male sculptors